John Frum (also called Jon Frum, John Brum, and John Prum) is a mythic figure associated with cargo cults on the island of Tanna in Vanuatu. He is often depicted as an American World War II serviceman who will bring wealth and prosperity to the people if they follow him. Quoting David Attenborough's report of an encounter: E look like you. 'E got white face. 'E tall man. 'E live 'long South America."

In the 1990s, there was still reportedly over 5,000 members of the John Frum movement but as of 2022 there are fewer than 500. Now, only the village of Lamakara remains true to the John Frum cause on the island of Tanna. The rest of the island has been mostly converted by Christian missionaries based out of Sulphur Bay.

History

The religion centering on John Frum arose in the late 1930s, when Vanuatu was known as the New Hebrides, although there was a claim in 1949 that it had started in the 1910s. The movement was influenced by existing religious practice in the Sulphur Bay area of Tanna, particularly the worship of Keraperamun, a god associated with Mount Tukosmera. 

In one analysis of the cult, the figure was first known as John Broom, who was believed by followers to one day return from a distant land to sweep away the White colonials and return riches to the islands. In some versions of the story, a native man named Manehivi, using the alias "John Frum", began appearing among the native people of Tanna dressed in a Western-style coat, assuring the people he would bring them houses, clothes, food, and transport.

Others contend that John Frum was a kava-induced spirit vision. Said to be a manifestation of Keraperamun, this John Frum promised the dawn of a new age in which all White people, including missionaries, would depart the New Hebrides, leaving behind their goods and property for the native Melanesians. For this to happen, however, the people of Tanna had to reject all aspects of European society including money, Western education, Christianity and work on copra plantations, and they had to return to traditional kastom (the Bislama language word for customs).

In 1941, followers of John Frum rid themselves of their money in a frenzy of spending, left the missionary churches, schools, villages and plantations, and moved inland to participate in traditional feasts, dances and rituals. Most followers had come from the Presbyterian church. European colonial authorities sought to suppress the movement, at one point arresting a Tannese man calling himself John Frum, humiliating him publicly, imprisoning and ultimately exiling him along with other leaders of the cult to another island in the archipelago.

Despite this effort, the movement gained popularity in the early 1940s after 50,000 American troops were stationed in New Hebrides during World War II, bringing with them an enormous amount of supplies (or "cargo"). During the war, approximately 10,000 Ni-Vanuatu men served in the Vanuatu Labor Corps, a labor battalion of the United States Armed Forces. They provided logistical support to the Allied war effort during the Guadalcanal Campaign. The mass participation of Ni-Vanuatu men in the Labor Corps had a significant effect on the John Frum movement, giving it the characteristics of a cargo cult. 

After the war and the departure of the Americans, followers of John Frum built symbolic landing strips to encourage American airplanes to land and bring them "cargo". Versions of the cult emphasizing the American connection interpret "John Frum" as a corruption of  "John from (America)" (although it could mean "John from" anywhere not of Vanuatan origin).

In 1957, a leader of the John Frum movement, Nakomaha, created the "Tanna Army", a non-violent ritualistic society that organised military-style parades of men with faces painted in ritual colours and wearing white T-shirts with the letters "T-A USA" (Tanna Army USA). This parade takes place every year on February 15, the date on which followers believe John Frum will return, and which is observed as "John Frum Day" in Vanuatu.

In the late 1970s, John Frum followers opposed the imminent creation of an independent united nation of Vanuatu. They objected to a centralised government they feared would favor Western modernity and Christianity that would be detrimental to local customs. The John Frum movement has its own political party, Nagriamel led by Song Keaspai. The party celebrated its 50th anniversary on February 15, 2007. Chief Isaak Wan Nikiau, its leader, was quoted by the BBC from years past as saying that John Frum was "our God, our Jesus" and would eventually return.

In December 2011, the president of the John Frum movement (and jointly of Nagriamel) was Thitam Goiset, a woman of Vietnamese origin and sister of businessman Dinh Van Than, despite the leadership of these movements having been "previously [...] held by high ranking male chiefs". In 2013, Thitam Goiset was removed from her role as Vanuatu's ambassador to Russia amid evidence of corrupt activities.

Followers of the movement continue to celebrate John Frum Day each year in February. Europeans have made claims on the prophecy of being the leader, who have gained status in Vanuatuan communities through promising to bring development and investment to the communities, such as Claude-Philippe Berger, who died in July 2021, who styled himself the "traditional king of Tanna".

See also
 Melanesian mythology
 Prince Philip movement
 Turaga nation

References

Bibliography 

 
 Joël Bonnemaison, « Tanna : les hommes lieux (livre 2) » dans Les fondements d'une identité : territoire, histoire et société dans l'archipel de Vanuatu (Mélanésie) : essai de géographie culturelle, ORSTOM Paris, 1988, [lire en ligne [archive]]
 Tabani, Marc. 2008. Une pirogue pour le Paradis : le culte de John Frum à Tanna (Vanuatu) [archive], Paris : Éditions de la Maison des Sciences de l'Homme, 2008.
 Tabani, Marc. 2010. Le culte de John Frum et la tragédie du nouveau millénaire à Tanna (Vanuatu) [archive]. In Douaire-Marsaudon F. et Weichart G. (eds.), Pacific Religiosities. Marseille : Pacific-Credo Publications, 145-172.
 Tabani Marc, Marcellin Abong. 2013. Kago, Kastom, Kalja: the study of indigenous movements in Melanesia today [archive], Marseille, Pacific Credo Publications.

Filmography
 God Is American, feature documentary (2007, 52 min), by Richard Martin-Jordan, on Frum's cult at Tanna
 The Fantastic Invasion, documentary (1991, 59min) by Nigel Randell Evans for the BBC
 Into the Inferno, feature documentary (2016, 107 min), by Werner Herzog, on Tanna’s active volcano

Further reading
 Attenborough, D. (1960) Quest in Paradise. Lutterworth Press (reprinted 1963 Pan Books Ltd.)

 Huffer, Elise, Grands Hommes et Petites Îles: La Politique Extérieure de Fidji, de Tonga et du Vanuatu, Paris: Orstom, 1993, 
 Jarvie, I. C. (1964). The Revolution in Anthropology. London: Routledge & Kegan Paul (reprinted 1967) pp. 61–63. 
 Lindstrom, L. (1990.) "Big Men as Ancestors: Inspirations and Copyrights on Tanna (Vanuatu)". Ethnology, vol xxix no. 4. October.
 Theroux, P (1992). The Happy Isles of Oceania. Penguin Books 
 Tonks, Jon and Christopher Lord (2021) The Men Who Would Be King. Dewi Lewis 
 Nat. Geographic: May 1974. "Tanna (Island, New Hebrides, South Pacific Ocean) Awaits the Coming of John Frum (cargo cults of Melanesia since about 1940)".

External links
 Jon Frum Movement
 "In John They Trust" article in Smithsonian Magazine
 Evening spent with the John Frum movement on Tanna Island in Vanuatu, April 2013 (video)

Cargo cults
History of Vanuatu
Religion in Vanuatu
Vanuatu mythology
Oceanian deities
1940s in the New Hebrides
New religious movement deities
Messianism